Gary Corcoran (born 12 November 1990) is a British welterweight boxer.

Career
Corcoran defeated Danny Butler by unanimous decision to win the vacant WBO Inter-Continental super welterweight title.

He lost to Liam Williams challenging for the BBBofC super welterweight title.
Corcoran defeated Larry Ekundayo by split decision to win the vacant WBO Inter-Continental welterweight title.

Corcoran fought Jeff Horn for the WBO world welterweight title on 13 December 2017 and lost by TKO in round 11.

References

External links

1990 births
Light-middleweight boxers
Welterweight boxers
Living people
British male boxers
Boxers from Greater London
Sportspeople from Wembley